Speak Your Peace is the fourth and final album from crossover thrash/hardcore punk band Cryptic Slaughter. It was released in 1990 on Metal Blade Records and follows 1988's Stream of Consciousness. Actually, the band had split up following the 1988 album and remaining member, Les Evans, relocated from California to Oregon and reformed with three new members, including former Wehrmacht drummer, Brian Lehfeldt. The resulting album was quite a change in style for the band, moving from their hardcore punk roots more to a crossover thrash sound, complete with quirky rhythms and melodies. The band again split shortly after this release.

Track listing
"Born Too Soon" (Dave Hollingsworth, Les Evans, Bret Davis) – 5:15
"Still Born, Again" (Hollingsworth, Evans) – 3:32
"Insanity by the Numbers" (Hollingsworth, Davis) – 2:39
"Co-Exist" (Hollingsworth, Evans, Davis) – 4:10
"Deathstyles of the Poor and Lowly" (Hollingsworth, Davis) – 2:00
"One Thing or Another" (Hollingsworth, Evans, Davis) – 3:12
"Divided Minds" (Hollingsworth, Evans) – 4:24
"Speak Your Peace" (Hollingsworth, Evans, Brian Lehfeldt) – 3:20
"Killing Time" (Hollingsworth, Evans) – 5:15

Credits
 Dave Hollingsworth – vocals
 Les Evans – guitar
 Bret Davis – bass
 Brian Lehfeldt – drums
 Recorded Dogfish Sound, Newberg, Oregon, USA
 Produced by Cryptic Slaughter and Drew Canulette
 Engineered by Drew Canulette
 Mixed at Pace Video Center, Portland, Oregon, USA
 Cover art by Mike King and Steve Cheese

External links
Relapse Records band page
BNR Metal discography page
Encyclopaedia Metallum album entry

1990 albums
Cryptic Slaughter albums